Benoît Jean Guy Lumineau is a French former footballer who is last known to have played as a forward player for Bressuire.

Career

In 2008, Lumineau signed for Indonesian side Persiwa Wamena.

In 2012, he signed for Breissure in the French sixth division.

References

External links
 

French footballers
French expatriate footballers
French expatriate sportspeople in Indonesia
Liga 1 (Indonesia) players
Persiwa Wamena players
Expatriate footballers in Indonesia
Association football forwards